Alex H W Lai is a horse racing jockey, who completed his apprenticeship in December 2007. He was a champion apprentice for two seasons when he was indentured to the stable of Peter Ho. He rode 31 winners in Hong Kong in 2010/11 for a career total of 185. In 2013/14, he rode 18 winners in Hong Kong for a career total of 236.

Major Wins
HKG3 Queen Mother Memorial Cup - Mr Medici (2009)
HKG2 Sprint Cup - Ultra Fantasy (2009)
G1 Sprinters' Stakes at Nakayama - Ultra Fantasy (2010)

Performance

References

External links 
The Hong Kong Jockey Club 

Hong Kong jockeys
Living people
Year of birth missing (living people)